Peter Edward Ostling (born July 22, 1944), also known as Peter Jason, is an American character actor. He has appeared in over eighty films and a hundred television series. He played Con Stapleton in the series Deadwood. He was a frequent collaborator with Walter Hill and John Carpenter on their films, eight and six times respectively. He voiced Sergeant Dornan in the video game Fallout 2. He starred in supporting roles for the films 48 Hrs. and Arachnophobia.

Personal life
Born in Hollywood, Jason grew up in Balboa Peninsula, Newport Beach. He attended Newport Beach Elementary School, Horace Ensign Junior High and Newport Harbor High School. After graduating, he attended Orange Coast College and studied drama at Carnegie Mellon University.

Filmography

Further reading 

 Voisin, Scott, Character Kings: Hollywood's Familiar Faces Discuss the Art & Business of Acting. BearManor Media, 2009.

References

External links 

 
 Industrycentral.net

1944 births
Living people
American male film actors
American male television actors
American male voice actors
Male actors from Los Angeles
20th-century American male actors
21st-century American male actors
Male actors from Hollywood, Los Angeles
Newport Harbor High School alumni